The Master of the 1540s was a South Netherlandish painter active between 1541 and 1551.  About thirty portraits dating to that decade have been ascribed to them; the identity of one of the sitters, Gillis van Shoonbeke (guardian of the hospital in Antwerp), indicates that the artist was
active in that city.  Their clientele appears to have been more modest than that patronized by Antonis Mor and Willem Key, but their paintings display considerable talent and cultivation.

References
Master of the 1540s at Answers.com

Early Netherlandish painters
1500s births
1540s deaths
1540s, Master of the
16th-century Flemish painters